Vaughan is an unincorporated community in Warren County, North Carolina, United States. Vaughan had its own post office until October 22, 2011; it still has its own ZIP code, 27586.

The Mary Ann Browne House and Buck Spring Plantation are listed on the National Register of Historic Places.

References

Unincorporated communities in Warren County, North Carolina
Unincorporated communities in North Carolina